Anchor Inc. (アンカー株式会社 Ankā kabushikigaisha) is a Tokyo-based company specializing in renewable energy and software development. The company was established in 1996 by Tekken team alumni Masahiro Onoguchi and his brother Kōichi Onoguchi, with the original primary focus on developing 3D fighting and wrestling video game titles.

List of games developed by Anchor Inc.

Arcade
Toy Fighter

Dreamcast
Ultimate Fighting Championship

PlayStation 2
Pride FC
JoJo's Bizarre Adventure: Phantom Blood (2006)

Xbox
WWE Raw
WWE Raw 2

Cancelled
Force Five (later turned into Jingi Storm: The Arcade by Atravita)

More info     = http://www.giantbomb.com/anchor-inc/65-5089/

Software companies based in Tokyo
Japanese companies established in 1996
Video game companies established in 1996
Video game companies of Japan
Video game development companies